Barbastro (Latin: Barbastrum or Civitas Barbastrensis, Aragonese: Balbastro) is a city in the Somontano county, province of Huesca, Spain. The city (also known originally as Barbastra or Bergiduna) is at the junction of the rivers Cinca and Vero.

History 
An ancient Celtiberian city called  Bergidum or Bergiduna, in Roman times  Barbastro (now called  Brutina) was included in the Hispania Citerior region, and later of Hispania Tarraconensis.

After the fall of  the Western Roman Empire, it was part of the Visigoth kingdom. Barbastro  and  the Barbitaniya area were overtaken by Musa bin Nusair in 717, as part of the Umayyad push to conquer northern states of the Marca Hispanica and the name Madyar was given to the town.

It was later settled by the Banu Jalaf who made it the capital of the Emirate of Barbineta and Huesca until 862, and was known as the Emirate of Brabstra until 882.

In 1064, Sancho Ramírez, King of Aragón, and his Frankish Christian forces, led by William VIII of Aquitaine and Le Bon Normand, invaded the city, which at the time was part of   the emir of Zaragoza.  This attack was known as the Siege of Barbastro. Contemporary sources state that 50,000 people died in the attack, but modern historians view this as an exaggeration since the whole population of the town probably did not exceed 2,000. The following year, however, it was reconquered by the Moors. In 1101 it was conquered by Peter I of Aragon, who made it a bishopric seat. Barbastro since then followed the history of Aragon and Spain.

During the Spanish Civil War  51 Claretians were executed in Barbastro by militiamen of the Popular Front. Numerous socialist, republican and communist activists were jailed and executed in the following years after the Spanish Civil War.

Barbastro's economy flourished until the 20th century, when a period of decline began, ending only in the 1960s due to the growth of agricultural production.

Notable residents 

Bartolomé and Lupercio de Argensola, brothers, historians and poets who were part of the Spanish siglo de oro,  a period of flourishing in arts and literature in Spain.
Antonio Ricardos Carrillo de Albornoz, was a famous Spanish army general, who lived in the 18th century.
Josemaría Escrivá, founder of Opus Dei, an institution of the Roman Catholic Church.
María Pilar Crespí Pérez, chemist by the Universidad Complutense de Madrid and teacher in the Colegio Estudio. Wife of Don Antonio Corróns Rodríguez, Ph.D., and mother of D. Pablo Antonio Corróns Crespí (AENOR) and D. Jorge Antonio Corróns Crespí (Proteyco Ibérica, S.A.).

Twin towns 

  Saint-Gaudens, Haute-Garonne

See also
Barbastro Cathedral
Diocese of Barbastro-Monzón
Un Dios Prohibido, a fim about the massacre of priests in Barbastro during the Civil War

References

Sources

The Historic Atlas of Iberia

External links
 
 
 History of Entremuro (in Spanish) Places, people and events about city's old quarter

Municipalities in the Province of Huesca